The candidates for the 2006 Liberal Party of Canada leadership election received the following endorsements. Ex officio delegates have an automatic vote at the convention and are denoted with an asterisk (*).

Registered candidates

Scott Brison (43)

Stéphane Dion (153)

Ken Dryden (62)

Martha Hall Findlay (8)

Michael Ignatieff (104)

Gerard Kennedy (133)

Bob Rae (118)

Withdrawn candidates

Carolyn Bennett

Maurizio Bevilacqua

Hedy Fry

Joe Volpe

Unaffiliated MPs and Senators

Undecided Members of Parliament (1 of 102)
 Belinda Stronach, Newmarket—Aurora, ON

Undecided Senators (10 of 63)
Willie Adams, Nunavut
George Baker, Newfoundland and Labrador

Ione Jean Christensen, Yukon
Eymard Georges Corbin, New Brunswick
Ross Fitzpatrick, British Columbia
Yoine Goldstein, Quebec

Céline Hervieux-Payette, Quebec
Paul J. Massicotte, Quebec
Lorna Milne, Ontario
Lucie Pépin, Quebec

Neutral Members of Parliament (9 of 102)
 Raymond Bonin (Nickel Belt, ON), chairman of the Liberal Caucus
 Bill Graham (Toronto Centre, ON), Interim Leader of the Liberal Party
 Jean Lapierre (Outremont, QC), former cabinet minister
 Dominic LeBlanc (Beauséjour, NB), co-chairman of the Leadership Convention
 Paul Martin (LaSalle—Émard, QC), former prime minister
 Peter Milliken  (Kingston and the Islands, ON), Speaker of the House of Commons
 Karen Redman (Kitchener Centre, ON), Liberal Caucus Whip
 Lucienne Robillard (Westmount—Ville-Marie, QC), interim deputy leader of the Liberal Party
 Tom Wappel (Scarborough Southwest, ON), backbench MP did not endorse anyone due to lack of a social conservative   He said that he would personally vote for Joe Volpe, if Volpe was still on the ballot by the time of the convention.

Neutral Senators (6 of 63)
Catherine Callbeck, PEI
Percy Downe, PEI
Joan Fraser, Quebec, Deputy Leader of the Opposition in the Senate
Dan Hays, Alberta, Leader of the Opposition in the Senate
Serge Joyal, Quebec
Marie-Paule Poulin, Northern Ontario, Chair of the Senate Liberal Caucus and candidate for party president
Source: The Hill Times, June 12

Summary of endorsements by Members of Parliament by Province

Newspaper endorsements

Ex officio delegates
List of ex officio delegates to the Liberal Party of Canada leadership election, 2006

Endorsement pages in campaign websites
Stéphane Dion
Martha Hall Findlay
Michael Ignatieff
Gerard Kennedy
Bob Rae

Other links
 Liberal Party of Canada leadership webpage
 List of endorsements of Liberal bloggers

References

Sources

 New Brunswick Telegraph-Journal "Rae brings campaign to N.B.", Page A3, May 11, 2006
 The Hill Times "An Update on Liberal Leadership Campaigns and some of their supporters", Page 17, July 24, 2006

Liberal Party of Canada
Liberal Party leadership election, 2006